Stonewall Jackson and the American Civil War is a book combining a biography and military history of Confederate Lt. General Thomas Jonathan "Stonewall" Jackson's actions and results during the American Civil War. Written by British soldier and author G.F.R. Henderson, it was originally published in 1898 and became the author's most well-known work.

The book follows Jackson's actions and results, beginning with his West Point and VMI days, to his Valley Campaign of 1862, as a corps commander in the Army of Northern Virginia under General Lee, and up to his wounding and death after Chancellorsville. The twenty-five chapter work took eight years to complete and was first printed in two volumes, but since has been reprinted several times with most copies available as one complete book.

Reprints and versions

The original version of this work was published in 1898 by London, New York, Longmans, Green and Co. It came in two volumes and contained 33 individual maps. The next published version came in 1900 from the same press, also in two volumes, and included an introduction by Field Marshal Viscount Wolseley. Two exact reprints of the original would follow in 1911 and 1919 (after Henderson's death in 1903), both also by the same publisher. Next would be three reprints of the work with the introduction by Viscount Wolseley (after his death) in 1926, January 1936, and July 1937, all again by the same press. However, the 1926 edition would be the last to be split into two volumes.

Chapters
 I. West Point (p. 1)
 II. Mexico (p. 21)
 III. Lexington, 1851–1861 (p. 47)
 IV. Secession, 1860–61 (p. 67)
 V. Harper's Ferry (p. 88)
 VI. The Battle Of Manassas Or Bull Run (p. 115)
 VII. Romney (p. 146)
 VIII. Kernstown (p. 185)
 IX. M'Dowell (p. 225)
 X. Winchester (p. 260)
 XI. Cross Keys And Port Republic (p. 304)
 XII. Review Of The Valley Campaign (p. 344)
 XIII. The Seven Days. Gaines' Mill (p. 380)
 XIV. The Seven Days. Frayer's Farm And Malvern Mill (p. 415)
 XV. Cedar Run (p. 422)
 XVI. Groveton And The Second Manassas (470)
 XVII. The Second Manassas (Continued) (p. 521)
 XVIII. Harpers Ferry (p. 547)
 XIX. Sharpsburg (p. 580)
 XX. Fredericksburg (p. 622)
 XXI. The Army of Northern Virginia (p. 666)
 XXII. Winter Quarters (p. 700)
 XXIII. Chancellorsville (p. 720)
 XXIV. Chancellorsville (Continued) (p. 741)
 XXV. The Soldier And The Man (p. 779)

References

 Henderson, G.F.R., Stonewall Jackson and the American Civil War, Barnes & Noble, Inc. 2006.

Notes

External links
 Online text at Project Gutenberg

1898 non-fiction books
American biographies
History books about the American Civil War
American Civil War